NGC 3864 is a spiral galaxy located about 330 million light-years away in the constellation Leo. The galaxy was discovered by astronomer Édouard Stephan on March 23, 1884. It is a member of the Leo Cluster.

See also
 List of NGC objects (3001–4000)

References

External links
 

3864
36620
Leo (constellation)
Leo Cluster
Astronomical objects discovered in 1884
Spiral galaxies